"Tunnoton" is a Finnish-language song by Finnish pop singer Jenni Vartiainen, released as the debut single from her debut album Ihmisten edessä on 11 April 2007, by Warner Music Finland. Written by Juhani Lappalainen and composed by A. Stierncreutz, the song peaked at number 22 on the Finnish Download Chart.

Track listing
Digital download

Charts

References

2007 debut singles
Jenni Vartiainen songs
Finnish-language songs
2007 songs
Warner Music Finland singles